St Patrick's and St Brigid's College is a secondary school located in Claudy, just outside Derry, Northern Ireland.

References

External links
Official website
"St Patrick's and St Brigid's College win league." from Cricket Ireland/Europe

Catholic secondary schools in Northern Ireland
Secondary schools in County Londonderry